The Eastern Yi may be:

The ancient Dongyi (東夷)
The modern Nasu people (東彝), or their language